Horse Creek Wildlife Management Area is located in Wyoming County near Pineville, West Virginia.  Located on  that includes a small lake, the open fields of the WMA are bordered by steep hardwood forest.

Hunting and Fishing

Hunting opportunities are limited by the small acreage of the Horse Creek WMA.  Prospects for hunting include deer, raccoon, and squirrel.

Fishing opportunities in the  Horse Creek Lake include largemouth bass, bluegill, channel catfish and trout.

Camping is not permitted in the WMA.

See also
Animal conservation
Fishing
Hunting
List of West Virginia wildlife management areas

References

External links
West Virginia DNR District 4 Wildlife Management Areas
West Virginia Hunting Regulations
West Virginia Fishing Regulations

Wildlife management areas of West Virginia
Protected areas of Wyoming County, West Virginia